This is a list of songs that have peaked at number-one on the Oricon Singles Chart, the preeminent singles chart in Japan, which was created in 1967, and monitors the number of physical single purchases of the most popular singles.

1960s and 1970s

1980s

1990s

2000s

2010s

2020s

See also 
 List of best-selling singles in Japan
 List of Oricon number-one albums
 Oricon

Japanese music-related lists
Oricon 0000
Oricon